Dudleya anthonyi, known by the common name San Quintín liveforever, is a succulent plant endemic to the San Quintín volcanic field, located on Isla San Martín and the adjacent mainland bay of Bahia San Quintín, within Baja California.

Description
Dudleya anthonyi is very similar in appearance to Dudleya pulverulenta. Its stem leaves are narrower, its petals are narrower and united only below the middle, its sepals are narrow above but broadened at the base, and its petals are sharply acute. Dudleya anthonyi may usually be distinguished from D. puverulenta by its narrower and more rigid leaves, which taper from the base.

The form of the plants varies persistent with location. Plants found on San Martin tend to be larger and with wider leaves than their counterparts on the coast of San Quintin Bay. Further south along the coast, another form exists in Socorro Canyon, with tall, erect stems, giving a resemblance of miniature trees.

The plant is unusual among Dudleya in that after seed is set, the flowers and their pedicels will become almost vertical.

Flowering is from early June to July.

Taxonomy 
The plant is named in honor of the ornithologist Alfred Anthony, who visited the area in 1897.

The species is known to hybridize with Dudleya cultrata on Isla San Martín. Their range overlaps on both the mainland and San Martín, but the hybrid is only obvious on the island.

The chromosome number is n = 17.

Distribution and habitat 
Dudleya anthonyi occurs is restricted to the San Quintín volcanic field, the scope of which includes the Island of San Martin and the adjacent coast and peninsulas in the San Quintin Bay. The plant has a tendency to occur, like other Dudleya, on cliffs and canyons.

References

External links
 crassulaceae.com - Dudleya anthonyi
 Plants of the World Online - Dudleya anthonyi
 The genus Dudleya Britton & Rose (Crassulaceae): its systematics and biology.

anthonyi
Flora of Baja California
Endemic flora of Mexico
Flora of the California desert regions
Natural history of the Peninsular Ranges
Taxa named by Joseph Nelson Rose
Flora without expected TNC conservation status